Thomas Blanchard was the third Principal of Brasenose College, Oxford

Blanchard was born in York. He held livings at Speen, Boxford, and Quainton; and was Principal of Brasenose from 1565 to 1574.

Footnotes

References

 

16th-century English people
Principals of Brasenose College, Oxford
People from York